Shelley Duvall is an American actress who began her career in 1970, appearing in Robert Altman's Brewster McCloud. She went on to have roles in numerous films by Altman throughout the 1970s, including the period Western film McCabe & Mrs. Miller (1971), the crime drama Thieves Like Us (1974), the ensemble musical comedy Nashville (1975), and the Western Buffalo Bill and the Indians, or Sitting Bull's History Lesson (1976). Duvall also had a minor role in Woody Allen's Annie Hall (1977). Her performance in Altman's subsequent psychological thriller 3 Women (1977) won her the Best Actress Award at the 1977 Cannes Film Festival, a Los Angeles Film Critics Association Award, as well as a BAFTA Award nomination in the same category.

In 1980, Duvall starred as Wendy Torrance in Stanley Kubrick's The Shining, an adaptation of the Stephen King novel of the same name. She subsequently starred as Olive Oyl in Altman's musical Popeye (1980), followed by a lead role in Terry Gilliam's fantasy film Time Bandits (1981). She had a main role in the Tim Burton short Frankenweenie (1984), followed by a supporting role in the comedy Roxanne (1987). Much of the late 1980s saw Duvall working as a producer and television host in children's programming, with her Faerie Tale Theatre (1982–1987) and Tall Tales & Legends (1985–1987). 

She continued to appear in film through the 1990s, with supporting parts in Steven Soderbergh's thriller The Underneath (1995), and the Henry James adaptation The Portrait of a Lady (1996), directed by Jane Campion. She also appeared in the children's film Casper Meets Wendy, and the supernatural horror film Tale of the Mummy (both 1998). Duvall's most recent performance was in the independent feature Manna from Heaven (2002).

Film

Television

References

External links
 

Actress filmographies
American filmographies